Hemsworth by-election may refer to one of four by-elections held in the British Parliamentary constituency of Hemsworth, in West Yorkshire:

 1934 Hemsworth by-election
 1946 Hemsworth by-election
 1991 Hemsworth by-election
 1996 Hemsworth by-election

See also
 Hemsworth (UK Parliament constituency)
 UK Parliament